The Victory Museum is a national military and war museum in Afyonkarahisar, Turkey, which was used as headquarters by then Commander-in-Chief Mustafa Kemal Pasha (Atatürk), his chief general staff and army commanders before the Great Offensive in August 1922.

References

External links

Museums in Afyonkarahisar
Turkish War of Independence
Military and war museums in Turkey